Alternative R&B (also referred to as alt-R&B, indie R&B, left-field R&B, and originally known as PBR&B, hipster R&B, or R-Neg-B) is a term used by music journalists to describe a stylistic alternative to contemporary R&B that began in the mid 2000s and came to prominence with musical artists such as Frank Ocean, The Weeknd, SZA, Khalid, and others. It is considered to be "more progressive and diverse" than its mainstream counterpart.

Etymology

"Alternative R&B" was once used by the music industry during the late 1990s to market neo soul artists, such as D'Angelo, Erykah Badu, and Maxwell. There has been a variety of discussion about the differing genre terms, with several critics describing the music under the broad category of "alternative R&B" or "indie R&B". The term "hipster R&B" has been commonly used, as has the term "PBR&B"—a combination of "PBR" (the abbreviation for Pabst Blue Ribbon, a beer most recently associated with the hipster subculture) and R&B. The first use of "PBR&B" was on Twitter by Sound of the City writer Eric Harvey on a 2011 post. Three years later, amazed and distressed at how far the term—meant as a joke—had traveled, Harvey wrote an extensive essay about it for Pitchfork. Slate suggests the name "R-Neg-B", as a reference to "negging". The genre has sometimes been called "noir&B". However, the terms are often criticized for "pigeonholing" artists into hipster subculture and being used in a derisive manner.

Characteristics

Barry Walters of Spin characterizes the unconventional style as an "exchange between EDM, rock, hip hop and R&B's commercial avant-garde", and cites Kanye West's 808s & Heartbreak, Frank Ocean's Nostalgia, Ultra and Channel Orange, The Weeknd's 2011 trilogy of mixtapes, Drake's Take Care, Miguel's Kaleidoscope Dream, Holy Other's Held and How to Dress Well's Total Loss as works associated with alternative R&B.  AllMusic's Andy Kellman cites the early albums of Bilal – 1st Born Second and Love for Sale – as antecedents to the "left-field R&B" that developed in the late 2000s. According to Jim Farber of the New York Daily News, the Soulquarians collective of the late 1990s and early 2000s, which Bilal was a part of, "corral[ed] leaders of the alternative R&B movement like the Roots and D'Angelo". Janet Jackson's sixth studio album The Velvet Rope (1997) is cited as one of the genre's stylistic origins, while NPR writer Stasia Irons stated Aaliyah's self-titled album "became a catalyst and bridge that created a smooth transition from '90s style R&B into Modern PBR&B".

Brandon Neasman of The Grio observes a "changing of the guard in R&B, from the smooth, cool heartthrobs to these vulnerable, off-kilter personalities" amid the prevalence of social media in society. Neasman finds the subject matter of "these new-wave artists" to be more "relatable" and writes of alternative R&B's characteristics:

Hermione Hoby of The Guardian writes that "the music is quietly radical" and observes "an ongoing, mutually enriching dialogue between indie and electronic musicians and R&B artists." Gerrick D. Kennedy of the Los Angeles Times feels that "the new movement feels like the most significant stylistic change in R&B since neo soul rolled around in the 1990s."

Response
There are two predominating opinions regarding alternative R&B as a classifier of sonic and lyrical characteristics within the larger R&B genre, the first of the two being a reluctant acceptance of its existence – if only for the sake of marketability.

Stereogum described the genre as a group of "co-conspirators, not a unified movement." Similarly in thought, How to Dress Well, while not offended by the term "PBR&B", finds it "tacky"; in an interview with Complex he points out that "if you put records [released by other alternative R&B artists] side-by-side, me and whoever, like you're just not going to [hear] the same sounds, period", before proceeding to cite Miguel as an example. Miguel himself has said that he is "comfortable" with the term "indie R&B" because it "insinuates a higher art. Or a deeper or somehow more artistic delivery of rhythm and blues music. It suggest there's more artistry within a genre that has become more of a cliché of itself."

Frank Ocean, when first asked in an interview with The Quietus, whether he considers "Novacane" to be an R&B song, responded, "You're limiting it. And that's why I always say that about the genre thing, because that's what it does. When you say 'it's that', you listen to it in a certain way. And you might not necessarily miss it, but it's just inaccurate, and you'll miss a couple of things, contextually." He proceeds to point out that race and vocal delivery are stereotypical signifiers of R&B music, in turn forcing himself and his peers into a category they may not identify within; when considering Nostalgia, Ultra Ocean argues that if he were a different complexion and "people would listen to it and be like 'Yeah, he borrowed from R&B but it's just not R&B – it's a lot of things, and you can't just call it 'R&B.'"

In an interview with The Guardian, FKA Twigs rejected the term by declaring, "Fuck alternative R&B!" She further explained: "It's just because I'm mixed race. When I first released music and no one knew what I looked like, I would read comments like: 'I've never heard anything like this before, it's not in a genre.' And then my picture came out six months later, now she's an R&B singer.'" The Fader echoes her sentiment, stating, "By adding the prefix, it sidelines R&B itself by implying it's not experimental, boundary-pushing or intellectual. It throws side-eye at the genre, while at the same time claiming to have discovered something worthy within it."

See also
 List of alternative R&B artists
 Alternative hip hop
 Progressive soul

References

Further reading 
 
 
 

 
African-American music
Contemporary R&B genres
Microgenres